Inés de Zúñiga y Velasco (1584–1647) was a Spanish royal court official. She was married to Gaspar de Guzmán, Count-Duke of Olivares, lady-in-waiting to Margaret of Austria, Queen of Spain, Camarera mayor de palacio to Elisabeth of France (1602–1644) in 1627–1643, and a royal governess of Balthasar Charles, Prince of Asturias.

References 

1584 births
1647 deaths
Spanish ladies-in-waiting
17th-century Spanish women
Royal governesses